Stefano Bruno Galli (born in Bollate, 16 May 1966) is an Italian professor and politician, considered an expert in Lombard nationalism and culture.

He teaches political science at the University of Milan and is well known thanks to his publications about constitutions, nationalism and autonomism. He was elected to the Lombard Regional Council in 2013 and he was nominated Regional Minister of Culture and Autonomy in 2018 by Attilio Fontana.

Publications 
La Lombardia si merita l'autonomia (Milan, 2017)
Interventi intraprendenti. Lombardismo Autonomismo Federalismo (Milan, 2017)
Serve un No. Riflessioni su una pessima riforma costituzionale (Roma, 2016)
G. Miglio, Lo scienziato della politica (Milan, 2015)
Émile Chanoux, federalismo e autonomie (Milan, 2014)
Il Nord e la Macroregione alpina (Milan, 2013)
Le ragioni del grande Nord. Interventi su federalismo, secessione, Europa dei popoli (Turin, 2012)
Il Grande Nord. Cultura e destino della Questione settentrionale (Milan, 2012)

References 
Regione Lombardia
Osservatorio Metropolitano di Milano

1966 births
Living people